Association Sportive d'Arta (currently known as Arta Solar 7 for sponsorship reasons) is a football club from Arta, Djibouti which plays in the Djibouti Premier League, the highest level of Djiboutian football. Their home stadium, like all Djiboutian teams, is the 20,000-capacity El Hadj Hassan Gouled Aptidon Stadium.

History
The club was founded as AS Compagnie Djibouti-Ethiopie in 1980. From 2007 to 2014, they were known as AS CDE-Colas. They have since been known as AS CDE/Arta The Fairy Mountaineers when sponsored by Ethio-Djibouti Railways (and Arta/SIHD when sponsored by the International Hydrocarbon Society.

As of 2018, the club is known as Arta Solar 7, due to sponsorship with Djibouti-based Solar power company Solar 7.

Performance in CAF competitions
CAF Champions League: 2 appearances
2022 - First Round
2023 - First Round

CAF Confederation Cup: 3 appearances
2019 - Preliminary Round
2020 - Preliminary Round
2021 - Preliminary Round

Results
PR = Preliminary round
FR = First round

Performance in UAFA competitions
Arab Champions League 3 appearances
2023 - Preliminary Round
2008 - Round of 32
2006 - Round of 32

Performance in CECAFA competitions
Kagame Interclub Cup 4 appearances
2019 - Group Stage
2018 - Quarter-finals
2006 - Group Stage
2001 - Group Stage

Players

Current squad

Players with multiple nationalities
  Samuel Akinbinu
  Christopher Dilo
  Warsama Hassan
  Alex Song
  Alain Traoré

References

Football clubs in Djibouti
Association football clubs established in 2017
2017 establishments in Djibouti